Herpetogramma minoralis is a moth of the family Crambidae.

Distribution
It is known from Ghana, La Réunion, Madagascar, Mauritius, Nigeria and Seychelles.

The wingspan is about 16 mm.

References

Moths described in 1892
Herpetogramma
Moths of Africa